Daisy Curwen (6 December 1889 – 25 June 1982) was a former British swimmer world record holder in the 100 m freestyle. Curwen competed at the 1912 Summer Olympics in Stockholm, but could not start in the final race any more due to an appendectomy during the event.

Biography
Curwen was born in December 1889 in Liverpool, England. She began swimming with her local club in Liverpool when she was 13. Between 1903 and 1917, Curwen won the Liverpool and District 100 yards freestyle event fourteen times. Curwen broke the world record for the 100 metres freestyle twice, first in September 1911 and again in June 1912. She also set six more world records in events from the 100 to 300 yards.

At the 1912 Summer Olympics in Stockholm, Sweden, Curwen competed in the women's 100 metre freestyle event. In her heat, Curwen set a new Olympic record. She went on to qualify for the final of the race, but was unable to start, after suffering with appendicitis which required surgery. As a result, Curwen also missed an opportunity to swim in the women's 4 × 100 metre freestyle relay race, where Great Britain won the gold medal.

Curwen did not compete in swimming after World War I. She died in Wallasey in June 1982 at the age of 92.

See also
 World record progression 100 metres freestyle

References

External links
 

1889 births
1982 deaths
English female swimmers
World record setters in swimming
Olympic swimmers of Great Britain
Sportspeople from Liverpool
Swimmers at the 1912 Summer Olympics